St. Mary's Anglo-Indian Higher Secondary School is a Catholic higher secondary school for boys in Chennai, Tamil Nadu, India, operated by the Salesians of Don Bosco. It is located on Armenian Street, Broadway opposite the High Court and adjacent to St Mary's Co-Cathedral.

St. Mary's is one of the oldest schools in India, and one of the first five schools to be set up during the British period. It stands out today among the city schools for having often secured centum results in the Board Exams.

History 
Saint Mary's Anglo Indian Higher Secondary School was founded in 1839 by the Rt. Rev. Joseph Carew, D.D., for the purpose of affording the Catholic youth of Madras an education. It was known for nearly 44 years as St. Mary's Seminary and Day School. The first principal was the Very Rev. Dr. William Kelly of Maynooth. The school celebrated its 175th year celebrations recently.

Motto 
The school's motto is "Viriliter Age" - Latin for "Act Like A Man".

School anthem 
God bless St.Mary's school that we love,
Stand beside her, and guide her,
To do the right, by the light from above;
In the classrooms, on the play-fields,
'Long the roadways, where we roam,>
God bless St.Mary's our school, our Home>
God bless St.Mary's our school, our Home

Alumni 
There are 483 members in the Alumni Association of St. Mary's, which has meetings on the second Saturday of each month. There are 6 office-bearers and 12 councillors of the unit. Alumni Day is celebrated annually on 2 October Some of the activities are: scholarships to deserving students, cash awards for outstanding athletes, Christmas Day celebrations to help poor students. The unit is attempting to procure a piece of land for the present pupils for games like volleyball and basketball.

Gallery

References
http://stmarysaihss.com/

External links

 St.Mary's Alumni Association Website
 Salesians Province of Chennai Website
 Earliest_Schools_in_Chennai

Salesian secondary schools
Catholic secondary schools in India
Boys' schools in India
Christian schools in Tamil Nadu
High schools and secondary schools in Chennai
Educational institutions established in 1839
1839 establishments in British India